Lachlan Murdoch (born February 16, 1986) is a Canadian film and television actor, best known for playing Constable Henry Higgins on Murdoch Mysteries.

Filmography

Television

References

External links
 

Male actors from Vancouver
Canadian male film actors
Canadian male television actors
Canadian male voice actors
1986 births
Living people